Third Season is an album by the jazz tenor saxophonist Hank Mobley recorded on February 24, 1967, but not released on the Blue Note label until 1980 as LT 1081. It contains performances by Mobley with trumpeter Lee Morgan, alto saxophonist  James Spaulding, pianist Cedar Walton, bassist Walter Booker, drummer Billy Higgins, and guitarist Sonny Greenwich.

Reception
The AllMusic review by Scott Yanow awarded the album 4 stars stating, "The music is mostly in the hard bop vein, with hints of modality and the gospel-ish piece "Give Me That Feelin'," but Greenwich's three solos are a bonus and the performances of five Mobley originals and one by Morgan are up to the usual caliber of Blue Note's releases. Pity that this one has been lost in the shuffle."

Track listing 
All compositions by Hank Mobley except as indicated
 "An Aperitif" - 6:57
 "Don't Cry, Just Sigh" - 6:56
 "The Steppin' Stone" (Lee Morgan) - 5:40
 "Third Season" - 6:49
 "Boss Bossa" - 5:15
 "Give Me That Feelin'" - 6:36

Personnel 
 Hank Mobley – tenor saxophone
 James Spaulding – alto saxophone
 Lee Morgan – trumpet
 Cedar Walton – piano
 Sonny Greenwich – guitar
 Walter Booker – double bass
 Billy Higgins – drums

References

External links 
 

1980 albums
Albums produced by Alfred Lion
Blue Note Records albums
Hank Mobley albums
Albums recorded at Van Gelder Studio